Pegon (Javanese and Sundanese: , ; also known as) was a modified Arabic script used to write the Javanese, Sundanese, and Madurese languages, as an alternative to the Latin script or the Javanese script and the old Sundanese script. In particular, it was used for religious (Islamic) writing and poetry from the fifteenth century, particularly in writing commentaries of the Qur'an. Pegon includes symbols for sounds that are not present in Modern Standard Arabic. Pegon has been studied far less than its Jawi counterpart which is used for Malay, Acehnese and Minangkabau.

Etymology
The word Pegon originated from the Javanese word , which means 'deviate', due to the practice of writing the Javanese language with Arabic script, which was considered unconventional by Javanese people.

History
One of the earliest dated examples of the usage of Pegon may be Masa'il al-ta'lim, a work on Islamic law written in Arabic with interlinear translation and marginal commentary in Javanese.

Letters
One additional letter is used in foreign loanwords: . These new letters are formed by the addition of dots to base letter forms. Pegon is not standardized and variation can be seen in how these additional letters are represented, most commonly in the position of the dots (above or below) and the number of dots (one or three).

Diacritics 
Diacritic marks are used in Pegon to represent vowel sounds or in some cases a lack thereof. Their prevalence in Pegon text varies from marking every letter, to being present only to differentiate particular vowel sounds. Full marking of letters is common in Islamic religious texts as it is reminiscent of the use of tashkil for guiding pronunciation when reading the Qur'an. Pegon text with minimal marking is increasingly common as the base letters often indicate the underlying vowel which renders the diacritics unnecessary, in this case only fathah and maddah are used to differentiate distinct vowel sounds. A version of the script which uses no diacritics at all, similar to Jawi, is known as  meaning 'bare/bald' in Javanese.
 Fathah (◌َ) is sometimes used to represent , particularly in religious texts.
 Kasrah (◌ِ) is sometimes used to represent , particularly in religious texts.
 Dammah (◌ُ) is sometimes used to represent , particularly in religious texts.
 Maddah (◌ٓ) is used to represent .
 Sukun (◌ْ) is sometimes used to represent a closed consonant with no vowel following, particularly in religious texts.
 Alif hamzah ( أ ) is used for vowel initial words, as is detailed below.

Comparison of Pegon and Jawi

The main difference between Jawi and Pegon is that the latter is almost always written with vowel diacritics. Javanese written without any vowel diacritics, similar to Jawi is called , meaning 'bare/bald' in Javanese. The orthographic rules of Jawi and Pegon differ, with Jawi spelling being much more standardised than Pegon. Pegon tends to write all vowel sounds of native words explicitly, either with full letters or diacritics, whereas Jawi orthography sometimes omits alif in certain positions where an  would be pronounced, similarly other vowel sounds may not be written explicitly.

For those additional letters representing sounds not present in Arabic, some letters have the same appearance in both Jawi and Pegon, while others differ. Pegon also features two additional letters for sounds native to Javanese which are not present in Malay. Also the form of kaf used differs between the two varieties with Pegon using the Arabic form, while Jawi uses the Persian form.

Transliteration
The United States Library of Congress published a romanization standard of Jawi and Pegon in 2012.

See also
Jawi alphabet
Abjad Pegon (in Indonesian)
Abjad Jawi (in Indonesian)

Footnotes

References
Gallop, A. T. (2015). A Jawi sourcebook for the study of Malay palaeography and orthography. Indonesia and the Malay World, 43(125), 13–171.
Jacquerye, Denis Moyogo. (2019). Proposal to encode Javanese and Sundanese Arabic characters. Unicode.

Arabic alphabets
Indonesian scripts
Javanese language
Sundanese language